WCDT (1340 AM) is a radio station  broadcasting an adult contemporary format. Licensed to Winchester, Tennessee, United States, the station is currently owned by Alton Tipps and features programming from ABC Radio and Jones Radio Network.

The station is an affiliate of the Tennessee Titans radio network.  The current staff includes former owner Tommy Yarbrough, billing/traffic Jeanetta Shields, air talent Karen Shetters, advertising sales Sherry Price, news Jan Tavalin, air talent Al Tipps, sports announcer Greg Roberson, football announcer Al Clark, baseball announcer Stanley Bean, and board operators Ensley McKay, Jeremy Pickett, Destany Shields, Peyton Garner, and Aaron Jones.

References

External links
WCDT Facebook

CDT
Mainstream adult contemporary radio stations in the United States
Radio stations established in 1948
1948 establishments in Tennessee